Matthew Guion Maher (born November 10, 1974) is a Canadian contemporary Christian music (CCM) artist, songwriter, and worship leader from Newfoundland, Canada, who lives in the United States. Three of his nine albums have reached the Top 25 Christian Albums Billboard chart and four of his singles have reached the Top 25 Christian Songs chart. His notable writing credits include "Your Grace Is Enough", "I Will Rise", "Because He Lives (Amen)", "Christ Is Risen", and "Lord I Need You". Maher has been nominated for nine Grammy Awards in his career and was awarded the Songwriter of the Year at the 2015 GMA Dove Awards. He is a practicing Catholic.

Personal life 
Maher was born and raised in Newfoundland, Canada.  His parents recognized his musical talent, and he grew up taking piano lessons and immersing himself in a broad variety of music and playing in concert and jazz ensembles, singing in a choir, and playing in a garage rock band.

Maher started his post-secondary studies at Memorial University of Newfoundland and continued his studies in the Jazz Department at Arizona State University. He studied jazz piano and earned a music degree there. He paid for his first three years of college by playing piano in a hotel.

Maher is married to Kristin Fisher; they live in Nashville, Tennessee, with their daughter and two sons.

Career 
His first label was the Spirit and Song, a division of OCP Publications, where he released his first three collections. Early in 2007 Maher signed to Essential Records. He released his first big-label album (and his fourth album overall) Empty and Beautiful on April 8, 2008. His second album with Essential Records (and his fifth album overall), Alive Again, was released on September 22, 2009. In late 2009, Maher toured with Michael W. Smith, Meredith Andrews and Phil Stacey on the "New Hallelujah Tour". Alive Again peaked at No. 6 on Billboard magazine's Top Christian Albums chart in 2009.

When Pope Benedict XVI visited the United States in April 2008, Maher was asked to lead worship for crowds of thousands at the Rally for Youth and Seminarians in Yonkers, New York, which also featured Kelly Clarkson, tobyMac and Third Day, among other musicians. He was subsequently interviewed on Fox News, where he played his title track from Empty and Beautiful.

Maher was a guest singer songwriter speaker at Crowder's Fantastical Church Music Conference at Baylor University in late 2010 put on by the David Crowder Band. In early 2011 he toured the United States on the Rock And Worship Roadshow headlined by MercyMe.

Maher performed "Lord, I Need You" before a crowd of nearly four million, including Pope Francis, for World Youth Day 2013 in Rio, Brazil. Other youth activities he has participated in include the 2013, 2015, and 2017 National Catholic Youth Conferences, all held in Indianapolis, Indiana. He also sang at the 2014 March for Life.

On March 17, 2015, Maher released his eighth studio album, Saints and Sinners, through Essential Records. "Because He Lives (Amen)" was the first single release off of the album, and additional tracks on the album include songwriting collaborations with Needtobreathe members Bo and Bear Rinehart, Jon Foreman of Switchfoot. In September 2017, Maher's ninth studio album, Echoes, released and earned Maher his ninth career Grammy Award nomination.

He is a two-time BMI Songwriter of the Year and in 2015 was named NSAI Songwriter of the Year. Along with his nine GRAMMY Award nominations, he has also been nominated for more than 20 GMA/Gospel Music Association Dove Awards in his career, including "Song of the Year", "Worship Song of the Year", "Pop Contemporary Christian Performance of the Year", and "Pop Contemporary Song of the Year".

On October 12, 2018, his song "Lord, I Need You" was certified Platinum by RIAA, his first certification.

His single "Alive and Breathing" reached top-5 in the Christian singles chart, in June 2020 the song started to chart on mainstream lists as well, hitting No. 3 on Rolling Stones trending 25 list as well as No. 25 on Billboard singles of the week.

 Discography 

Albums

Extended plays

Singles

 Awards and recognition Grammy Awards 2017 - nomination for the 60th Annual GRAMMY Awards for Best Contemporary Christian album, ECHOES
 2015 - four nominations for the 58th Annual GRAMMY Awards
 Best Contemporary Christian Music Album, Saints And Sinners
 Best Contemporary Christian Music Performance/Song, "Because He Lives (Amen)" from Saints And Sinners 
 Best Contemporary Christian Music Performance/Song, as co-writer for "Soul On Fire" by Third Day
 Best Contemporary Christian Music Performance/Song, as co-writer "Come As You Are" by Crowder
 2014 - two nominations for the 57th Annual GRAMMY Awards
 Best Contemporary Christian Music Album, All The People Said Amen
 Best Contemporary Christian Music Performance/Song, "Lord, I Need You" from All The People Said Amen
 2013 - nomination for the 56th Annual GRAMMY Awards for Best Contemporary Christian Music Performance/Song for "White Flag" from 2012 Passion compilation
 2012 - nomination for 55th Annual GRAMMY Awards for Best Contemporary Christian Music Performance/Song as co-writer for "I Lift My Hands" by Chris TomlinGMA Canada Covenant Awards 2008 Praise And Worship Album of the Year: Empty & Beautiful
 2009 nominee, Male Vocalist of the Year
 2009 nominee, Song of the Year: "As It Is In Heaven"
 2009 nominee, Praise and Worship Song of the Year: "As It Is In Heaven"
 2010 Album of the Year: Alive Again
 2010 Praise And Worship Album of the Year: Alive Again
 2010 Song of the Year: "Hold Us Together"
 2010 Praise And Worship Song of the Year: "Alive Again"
 2011 Male Vocalist of the Year
 2012 Pop/Contemporary Album of the Year: "The Love In Between"GMA Dove Awards 2010 nominee, Praise And Worship Song of the Year: Alive Again
 2010 nominee, Song of the Year: "Alive Again"
 2010 winner, Special Events Album of the Year: Glory Revealed II: The Word of God in Worship (Split win with Kari Jobe)
 2015 winner, Songwriter of the Year
 2019 winner, Christmas/Special Event Album of the Year: The Advent of ChristmasUnity Awards2003 winner, Best New Artist of the Year
2004 winner, Praise & Worship Song of the Year: "I Love You, Lord"
2008 winner, Best Artist of the YearOther'''
 2008 Catholic Album of the Year: Empty & Beautiful''

References

External links 

 

1974 births
Living people
20th-century American guitarists
20th-century American male singers
20th-century American singers
20th-century Canadian male singers
20th-century Roman Catholics
21st-century American guitarists
21st-century American male singers
21st-century American singers
21st-century Canadian male singers
21st-century Roman Catholics
American performers of Christian music
American Roman Catholics
Canadian emigrants to the United States
Canadian guitarists
Canadian performers of Christian music
Canadian Roman Catholics
Christian music songwriters
Contemporary Catholic liturgical music
Essential Records (Christian) artists
Guitarists from Arizona
Musicians from Newfoundland and Labrador
Performers of contemporary Christian music
Performers of contemporary worship music
Juno Award for Contemporary Christian/Gospel Album of the Year winners
21st-century Canadian guitarists